Hallongrotta (plural: hallongrottor) is the name of a common Swedish cookie. The name means "raspberry cave" in Swedish. In the United States they are known as thumbprint cookies. Similar cookies sold in Australia are known as jam drops.
The cookies are similar to shortbread cookies with an added filling. 
It is an easily baked molded cookie, flavored with vanilla. The cookies are typically made with butter, flour, baking powder, sugar and vanilla. The cookies are usually filled with raspberry jam.

See also
 Christmas cookies
 Cuisine of Sweden

References

Swedish desserts
Shortbread
Cookies
Foods with jam